{{Infobox football club season
|club               = Athletic Bilbao
|season             = 2020–21
|image              = 
|image_size         = 
|alt                = 
|caption            = 
|ownertitle         = 
|owner              = 
|chrtitle           = President
|chairman           = Aitor Elizegi
|mgrtitle           = Head coach
|manager            = Gaizka Garitano(until 3 January 2021)
Marcelino(from 4 January 2021)|stdtitle           = 
|stadium            = San Mamés
|league             = La Liga
|league result      = 10th
|cup1               = Copa del Rey
|cup1 result        = Runners-up
|cup2               = Supercopa de España
|cup2 result        = Winners
|league topscorer   = Álex Berenguer (8)
|season topscorer   = Raúl García (10)
|highest attendance = 
|lowest attendance  = 
|average attendance = 
|largest win        = Athletic Bilbao 4–0 Real BetisCádiz 0–4 Athletic BilbaoAthletic Bilbao 5–1 Getafe
|largest loss       = Athletic Bilbao 0–4 Barcelona
 |pattern_la1 = _athletic2021h
 |pattern_b1  = _athletic2021h
 |pattern_ra1 = _athletic2021h
 |pattern_sh1 = 
 |pattern_so1 = _athletic2021h
 |leftarm1    = FFFFFF
 |body1       = FFFFFF
 |rightarm1   = FFFFFF
 |shorts1     = 000000
 |socks1      = 000000
 |pattern_la2 = _athletic2021a
 |pattern_b2  = _athletic2021a
 |pattern_ra2 = _athletic2021a
 |pattern_sh2 = 
 |pattern_so2 = _athletic2021a
 |leftarm2    = FFFFFF
 |body2       = FFFFFF
 |rightarm2   = FFFFFF
 |shorts2     = BBBBCC
 |socks2      = BBBBCC
 |pattern_la3 = _athletic1920a
 |pattern_b3  = _athletic1920a
 |pattern_ra3 = _athletic1920a
 |pattern_sh3 = 
 |pattern_so3 = 
 |leftarm3    = FFFFFF
 |body3       = FFFFFF
 |rightarm3   = FFFFFF
 |shorts3     = 227B32
 |socks3      = 227B32
|prevseason         = 2019–20
|nextseason         = 2021–22
}}
The 2020–21 season was the 122nd season in the existence of Athletic Bilbao and the club's 90th consecutive season in the top flight of Spanish football. In addition to the domestic league, Athletic Bilbao participated in this season's editions of the Copa del Rey and the Supercopa de España. The season covered the period from 20 July 2020 to 30 June 2021, with the late start to the season due to the COVID-19 pandemic in Spain.

The season was the first since the 2011–12 without Aritz Aduriz, who retired in May 2020.

Players
First-team squad

Reserve team

Out on loan

Transfers
In

Out

Pre-season and friendlies

Competitions
Overall record

La Liga

League table

Results summary

Results by round

Matches
The league fixtures were announced on 31 August 2020.

Copa del Rey

Supercopa

The draw was held on 17 December 2020.

Statistics
Appearances and goalsLast updated on 22 May 2021. Does not include the 2020 Copa del Rey Final, delayed until April 2021 and counted in the 2020–21 season in some resources – these stats are recorded under the 2019–20 Athletic Bilbao season article.''

|-
! colspan=14 style=background:#dcdcdc; text-align:center|Goalkeepers

|-
! colspan=14 style=background:#dcdcdc; text-align:center|Defenders

|-
! colspan=14 style=background:#dcdcdc; text-align:center|Midfielders

|-
! colspan=14 style=background:#dcdcdc; text-align:center|Forwards

|-
! colspan=14 style=background:#dcdcdc; text-align:center|Players who have made an appearance this season but have left the club

|}

Goalscorers

Notes

References

External links

Athletic Bilbao seasons
Athletic Bilbao